Nandan Jha (born 1981 in Jamshedpur) is the chairman of Interactive Forum on Indian Economy (a Govt. of India recognized 80G, 12A, 8A compliant) not-for-profit company.

He is the founder & Secretary General of Gandhi Mandela Foundation & initiated Gandhi Mandela Awards, a prestigious International award, for promoting Gandhian and Nelson Mandela’s values of peace, non-violence, Community Service and Social Development across the globe.

Jha is also the Organizer and founder of the Champions of Change (award), an Indian national award, for promoting Indian values like Swachhta, Community Service and Social Development, where the Hon’ble President of India or Vice President of India join as the Chief guest and the Awardees include CM, Ministers, MP, MLA & NGOs from across the country. 

Jha is also the founder and CEO of “Power Corridors” a monthly news magazine and Panchayati Times, a Digital news portal carrying rural India’s voice and followed by Hon’ble Prime Minister of India and several Union Ministers of India.

At the age of 17, Jha, with his courage and bravery, saved lives of a family and is a National Bravery Award and Jeevan Raksha Padak winner for the same. Achieving the idol for bravery was not a stop for him, he continued to serve the society with his organizations and initiated national awards for recognizing the efforts of those who work for social development & welfare.

Early life
Nandan Jha was born at Adityapur, Jamshedpur in the year 1981. Coming from a very simple village family, where his father served as a priest, mother was a housemaker, and had three siblings. He was awarded for his bravery by the Prime Minister I. K. Gujral after saving the life of an old woman and her children when cottage got fire in Patna, Bihar. Jha, from very young age, was associated with organizations like RSS, NCC, and various other campaigns. Mr. Jha, who has been a prominent face in the Rashtriya Swayamsevak Sangh has been also felicitated by the then RSS chief Prof. Rajendra Singh alias Rajju Bhaiya.

Career
Jha was associated with EaseMyTrip as the Chief Operating Officer and before that he worked as a Chief Operating Officer in News World India. He initially was associated with Sahara India as a Consultant of Corporate Communications for more than a decade.

Awards
Nandan Jha is National Bravery Award and Jeevan Raksha Padak awards winner for his courage and promptitude in saving life under circumstances.
National Bravery Award in 1997 by Prime Minister of India Inder Kumar Gujral
Jeevan Raksha Padak Award in 1998 by President of India K. R. Narayanan

References

1981 births
Living people
Journalists from Jharkhand
People from Jamshedpur